This article documents the history of Chelsea Football Club, an English association football team based in Fulham, West London. For a general overview of the club, see Chelsea F.C.

Start of Boehly's consortium era (2022–) 
On 7 May 2022, Chelsea Football Club confirmed that terms have been agreed for a new ownership group, led by Todd Boehly, Clearlake Capital, Mark Walter and Hansjörg Wyss, to acquire the club. On 25 May 2022, the British government approved the £4.25 billion Todd Boehly-led consortium takeover of Chelsea. On 30 May 2022, the sale was completed, ending Abramovich's 19 year ownership of the club.

The consortium led by Todd Boehly, chairman and CEO of Eldridge Industries, and Clearlake Capital, announced completion of the ownership transfer of Chelsea on the 30 May 2022. The consortium included Hansjörg Wyss, founder of the Wyss Foundation, and Mark Walter, co-founder and CEO of Guggenheim Partners. Walter and Boehly are owners of the Los Angeles Dodgers, the Los Angeles Lakers, and the Los Angeles Sparks. The transaction received all necessary approvals from the governments of the United Kingdom and Portugal, the Premier League, and other authorities that were mentioned by the club in their statement.

The club then announced on the 20 June that Bruce Buck, who served as Chairman since 2003, would be stepping down from his role effective 30 June although he would continue to support the club as a Senior Advisor. This was followed by the club then announcing the departure of long serving club director and de facto sporting director Marina Granovskaia on the 22 June 2022.

In the 2022 summer transfer window, Chelsea spent more money in a transfer window than any other club in Premier League history. The blues spent more than £250 million on players such as: Raheem Sterling, Marc Cucurella, Kalidou Koulibaly and Pierre-Emerick Aubameyang. Following a Champions League defeat to Dinamo Zagreb, Todd Boehly took the decision to sack Thomas Tuchel early in the 2022–23 season. The BBC reported an uneasy relationship between Boehly and Tuchel regarding transfer decisions. In September 2022, Chelsea took the decision to appoint Brighton & Hove Albion manager Graham Potter. In the January transfer window, Chelsea broke the British transfer record by signing Enzo Fernández for £107 million. By spending over £300 million in the January window, they became the first club in history to outspend all four major leagues combined.

Notes

Chelsea F.C.
Chelsea
Chelsea